The Internal Revenue Service Building is a federal building which serves as the headquarters of the Internal Revenue Service. It is located at 1111 Constitution Avenue, Northwest, Washington, D.C. (corner of 12th Street), in the Federal Triangle.

Building history
It was designed by architects and engineers in the Office of the Supervising Architect under Louis A. Simon, and built from 1928 to 1936. The cornerstone was laid in 1929 by Treasury Secretary Andrew W. Mellon. The building was opened for use in 1930, 16 months ahead of the planned completion date, making it the first Federal Triangle building to be opened.

The building was designated by Congress as a contributing structure to the Pennsylvania Avenue National Historic Site in 1966, and it was subsequently listed in the National Register of Historic Places.

References

External links

wikimapia
https://www.flickr.com/photos/dullshick/3024437276/
https://www.flickr.com/photos/nostri-imago/3363068625/
http://www.shca.com/internal-revenue-service/
http://washington.dukegill.com/irsbuilding.htm

Government buildings on the National Register of Historic Places in Washington, D.C.
Buildings of the United States government
Building
Government buildings completed in 1936
Historic district contributing properties in Washington, D.C.
Federal Triangle